Kaliprasanna Vidyaratna (Bangabdo [1255–1330]; 1849–1924 AD) was an Indian scholar of Sanskrit, academician and author. He was the principal of the Sanskrit College between 1908 and 1910. Vidyarayna played an important role in the revival of Sanskrit language.

Early life
Vidyaratna was born in a Bhattacharya Brahmin family of Ujirpur village, Barishal in British India. His father was Biswambhar Bhattacharya. Vidyaratna learned Sanskrit in a Chatuspathi at Dhanuka village of Faridpur district. He passed the entrance exam from Barishal and entered the Scottish Church College, Kolkata. After completion of B.A. and M.A. he was appointed as a teacher at the Dhaka Jagannath College in 1881. He worked in Presidency College since 1901, thereafter becoming principal of Sanskrit College.

Works
Vidyaratna wrote and edited many books on Indian Mythology, Vaisnavism, Puranas and Hindu culture such as: Brihat Shiva Puran, Sri Sri Krishna Charit, Bedanta Darshanam, Vrhadyamagita, Brihaddharam Puran, Shib Sanhita, Sanjib Chandrer Granthabali, Kali Kaivalyadayini, Nimai-Sannyas Gitavinay, Kalki Puran, Stab Kobochmala, Kalitantra and others. Until 1918, he visited tols to encourage Sanskrit education in Bengal and played a vital role in reviving the tol system. He became the president of 'Sanskrit Sahitya Parishad'. In 1911 Vidyaratna was awarded the 'Mahamohopadhya' title.

References

Bengali Hindus
Bengali writers
19th-century Bengalis
20th-century Bengalis
Bengali educators
Hindu philosophers and theologians
Indian Sanskrit scholars
19th-century Indian scholars
20th-century Indian scholars
Indian academics
Indian editors
19th-century Indian male writers
Indian male non-fiction writers
20th-century Indian non-fiction writers
19th-century Indian non-fiction writers
Indian religious writers
Indian spiritual writers
19th-century Indian philosophers
Indian theologians
20th-century Indian educators
19th-century Indian educators
Educationists from India
University of Calcutta alumni
Academic staff of the University of Calcutta
Sanskrit scholars from Bengal
Scholars from Kolkata
People from Barisal
Scottish Church College alumni
1849 births
1924 deaths